Tianshui Tram is a light rail system consisting of one route in Qinzhou District and Maiji District, Tianshui, Gansu, China.

History
Construction started on July 15, 2018 and testing started in March 2019 on a 600 meter long test section. The total investment for the project is estimated at 2.446 billion Yuan. The first phase started commercial operation on May 1, 2020.

Background
Public transport in Tianshui is almost solely serviced by bus routes. The Tianshui Tram will be the first rail transport in Tianshui for local transit. Due to the spatial layout of Tianshui in an east-west river valley, all planned lines will roughly follow the river. Tianshui government chose China Railway Signal & Communication (CRSC) to develop the tram line under a design-build-operate contract. The system will be the first revenue service of CRSC's new tram subsidiary, and will also function as a demonstration of their technology.

Lines 
There are 3 lines planned, of which as of 2019, only phase 1 on Line 1 has been built. Line 1 has been opened on May 1, 2020.

Line 1 consists of a main line from Jiekou Town to Economic Development Zone, and a branch line from Yangpodong to Tianshui Railway Station. Among them, the main line (Jiekou Town to Economic Development Zone) is a main rail transit line in Tianshui City that crosses the east-west main urban area, connecting the main urban areas of Qinzhou and Maiji districts, while taking into account the main towns and economic development zones around the main urban area.

Line 2 is a north-south line connecting Qinzhou District and Sanyangchuan. It mainly undertakes passenger transportation tasks in the main urban area of Tianshui City and Sanyangchuan New Area, while taking into account the role of public transportation in Sanyangchuan New Town.

Line 3 is a north-south line connecting Maiji District and Maijishan Scenic Area.

Recently, Line 1 Phase 2, including Tianshuisanzhong (Tianshui No. 3 Middle School) to Wulipu section, and Yangpodong to Yingchuanhekou section is under construction. There is also the section from Yingchuanhekou to Maijishan Grottoes on Line 3.

Line 1
Phase 1
The first phase of Line 1, and the only part of the tram network currently built, runs from Wulipu in Qinzhou District to Tianshui Railway Station, in Maiji District. The tram tracks follow the Jie River, and further along, the Wei River closely for the entire length and are built on a man-made raised riverbank. Phase 1 of Line 1 was constructed by China Railway Signal & Communication Guizhou Construction Company and has no at-grade road intersections. The commercial operation commenced on May 1, 2020.

Phase 2
Phase 2 was originally planned to start construction in October 2019, this was later revised to November 2020 with a construction period of three years and a budget of CNY6.547 billion (US$990 million). The second phase of Line 1 will be built simultaneously with the Line 2, as a west extension and an east extension branch line.

The west extension is planned to deviate from the riverbank, passing through the commercial centre of Qinzhou District, terminating at Sanzhong (Tianshui No.3 Middle School).

Station list

Service
Trams run every 10 minutes during peak-hours and every 15 minutes during regular hours.

Line 2
Line 2 is planned to split from Line 1 halfway, immediately crossing the Jie River, and servicing Tianshui South railway station, then continuing through the southeast part of the built-up area in Maiji District, on the south bank of the Wei River and Jie River. The line will total  and service 17 stations. Construction started with phase 2 of the Line 1. The east extension branch (Line 2) will run from Yangpodong to Yingchuan Hekou.

Line 3

Rolling stock 

The rolling stock on Line 1 is constructed by China Railway Signal & Communication Vehicle Company in Changsha. The trams use supercapacitors combined with batteries, instead of overhead lines, and are charged only at stops. Each tramset consists of five short wheelbase carriages. It is the first implementation of CRSC's new low floor trams. The trams are nicknamed "Boyue", named after a man from the Three Kingdoms period, Jiang Wei's courtesy name Boyue.

References

Transport in Gansu
Tianshui
Tram transport in China